Cielętniki  is a village in the administrative district of Gmina Zawonia, within Trzebnica County, Lower Silesian Voivodeship, in south-western Poland.

It was mentioned in the Liber fundationis episcopatus Vratislaviensis from ca. 1295–1305 under the Latinized Polish name Czenethniki.

References

Villages in Trzebnica County